François Pierre Hippolyte Ernest Breton, a French artist and archaeologist, was born in Paris in 1812. He studied under Regnier, Watelet, and
Champin, and exhibited some landscapes at the Salon. He contributed to Gailhabaud's 'Monuments anciens et modernes,' and in 1843 published 'Monuments de tous les Peuples.' His latest works were 'Pompeia,' 1855; 'Athènes,' 1861; and 'L'Alhambra,' 1873. He died in Paris in 1875.

References
 

19th-century French painters
French male painters
French archaeologists
1812 births
1875 deaths
Painters from Paris
Burials at Père Lachaise Cemetery
19th-century French male artists